Adona may refer to:
Adona, Arkansas
Adona language
Adona (river), a tributary of the Peța in Romania
ADONA, a commercial Perfluoroether from 3M